Abbati is an Italian surname. Notable people with the surname include:

Armanda Degli Abbati (1879–1946), Italian opera singer
Giuseppe Abbati (1836-1868), Italian artist
Pietro Abbati Marescotti (1768-1842), Italian mathematician
Pietro Giovanni Abbati (1683-1745), Italian set designer, painter, and engraver
Stefano Abbati (born 1955), Italian actor
Vincenzo Abbati (1803–1874?), Italian painter

See also
Abatis, a type of field fortification

Italian-language surnames